Prince Eugen Maximilianovich Romanowsky, 5th Duke of Leuchtenberg (8 February 1847 – 31 August 1901) was a son of Maximilian de Beauharnais, 3rd Duke of Leuchtenberg and Grand Duchess Maria Nikolaevna of Russia Duke of Leuchtenberg. He succeeded his brother Nicholas Maximilianovich as Duke of Leuchtenberg from 1891 until his death.

Early life
Eugen Maximilianovich was born in Saint Petersburg in 1847, as the second son and fifth child of Maximilian de Beauharnais, 3rd Duke of Leuchtenberg and Grand Duchess Maria Nikolaevna of Russia. After the death of his father in 1852, Eugen's older brother Nicolas became the fourth Duke of Leuchtenberg. When he died without an heir in 1891, Eugen became the fifth Duke, until his death in 1901. He was then succeeded by his younger brother George.

On 18 December 1852, after the death of their father, all the children of Duke Maximilian were allowed to wear the princely name and title of Romanowsky (or Romanovskaja for the female descendants), and were styled Imperial Highness.

Marriages

In 1869, he married Daria Konstantinowa Opotschinina, the granddaughter of Mikhail Kutuzov: she was made Countess of Beauharnais (died 1870 in childbirth).
 Daria, Countess de Beauharnais (19 March 1870, Saint Petersburg - 4 November 1937, Leningrad, Saint Petersburg). She married, firstly, Prince Leon Kotchoubey (1862-1927) in Baden-Baden, Karlsruhe, Baden-Württemberg on 7 September 1893; they divorced in 1911. Married, secondly, Waldemar, Baron von Graevenitz (1872-1916) in Saint Petersburg on 22 February 1911. Married, thirdly, Victor Markezetti (d. 15 January 1938). She had one child with her first husband:
Prince Eugéne Kotchoubey de Beauharnais (24 July 1894, Peterhof - 6 November 1951, Paris)

In 1878 he married Zeneïde Dmitrijewna Skobelew (also known as Zina) (died 1899), sister to the Russian general Mikhail Skobelev. Zina later had an open long-term affair with Grand Duke Alexei Alexandrovich of Russia.

Career
Eugen was a Division General in the Imperial Russian Army. In 1872-1873, he participated in the attack on Khiva and was awarded the Order of St. George, fourth degree. Between 1874 and 1877 he was commander of the Alexandria 5th Hussars. For his work in the Russo-Turkish War in 1877, he received the Order of St. Vladimir third class. He became a Lieutenant general in 1886, and was commander of the 37th Infantry Division from 1888 until 1893.

He died in 1901 in St. Petersburg, and is buried in the Alexander Nevsky Lavra.

Honours and arms

 : Grand Cross of the Grand Ducal Hessian Order of Ludwig, 14 October 1864
 : Knight of the Royal Order of Saint Hubert, 1869
 : Grand Cross of the Order of the Württemberg Crown, 1871
  Kingdom of Prussia: Knight of the Order of the Red Eagle, 1st Class, 21 August 1890

Ancestry

References

|-

1847 births
1901 deaths
Nobility from Saint Petersburg
Eugen
5
Imperial Russian Army generals
Russian people of German descent
Russian people of French descent
Burials at the Isidorovskaya Church of the Alexander Nevsky Lavra
Recipients of the Order of St. Vladimir, 3rd class
Military personnel from Saint Petersburg